Gelara or Geldara is a village in Sulaymaniyah Governorate, Kurdistan Region of Iraq, east of Sulaymaniyah.

External links
 Sarkashnaeb(Kurdish)
 geographic

References

Populated places in Sulaymaniyah Province
Kurdish settlements in Iraq